Sir Padamji Pestonji Ginwala (23 September 1875 – 18 April 1962) was a noted Parsi barrister, economist and public figure based at Bombay, later at Rangoon and lastly at Calcutta.

Early life
He was born in Ankleshwar in Gujarat to Pestonji Nusserwanji and did his early education from Ahmadabad from government school.

Lawyer
He completed his study of Law from University of Cambridge (Trinity Hall) and was called to the Bar at Lincoln's Inn in 1897. Two years later in 1899, he moved back to India and started practice as Advocate at Bombay High Court.

Teacher
Also gave his service as a professor of History and Economics at Elphinstone College, Bombay from 1899–1900.

In Burma and British India
In year 1900 he shifted to Rangoon, Burma, where he practised as advocate at Chief Court of Lower Burma and also served as Editor of Burma Law Times from 1907–1910.

In 1916, he served as Secretary to the Burma Legislative Council. He was member of Legislative Assembly of India from years 1921–23. He was the President of Rangoon Municipal Corporation for years 1921–22. Later he served as a member of Indian Tariff Board 1923–30 for which he served as president in 1926. He was knighted on 1 January 1927. He was also a delegate to Imperial Conference in 1930. He was one of the members of Second round Table Conference of India in 1931, Ottawa Conference of 1932 and World Monetary and Economic Conference in 1933. He was one of the experts on fiscal and tariff affairs and headed many committee. He published an essay on Railway Electrification and Industrialization, which work was later published by Indian Chamber of Commerece in 1945 In January 1945, an Iron and Steel (Major) Panel was set up by the then Government to recommend measures for the expansion of the steel industry, which was headed by him.  Later, he was Chairman of Tarminal Facilities Committee in 1947.

Here is his speech in the Indian Legislative Assembly on 5 March 1923, it is about system of taxation:-

Later life
In 1945 before independence of India, he settled in Calcutta. During 1949–1952, he served as Director of Indian Iron & Steel Co. promoted by Calcutta-based industrialist, Sir Ranjen Mookerjee of Martin Burn. He also served as President of Calcutta-based, the Indian Institute of Metals

Death
He died in Calcutta, aged 86.

Memorials
In 1963, a gold medal was established by Indian Institute of Metals in his memory. The Sir Padamji Ginwala Gold Medal is awarded to recognise a candidate securing the highest marks in the Associate Membership Examination (Part-l) of the Institute.

Family
His son Peston Padamji Ginwala (1919–2008) was also a senior barrister working at Calcutta High Court.

References

1875 births
1962 deaths
Indian barristers
Knights Bachelor
Indian Knights Bachelor
Alumni of Trinity Hall, Cambridge
Members of the Central Legislative Assembly of India
People from Bharuch district
19th-century Indian economists
Indian editors
Lawyers awarded knighthoods
Scholars from Gujarat
Members of Lincoln's Inn
Members of the Legislative Council of Burma
Scholars from Ahmedabad
20th-century Indian economists
20th-century Indian lawyers
Scholars from Mumbai
20th-century Indian politicians
Scholars from Kolkata
20th-century Burmese lawyers
Parsi people
Indian expatriates in British Burma
Lawyers in British India